The Copa de la Reina de Hockey Hierba is the national cup competition of women's field hockey in Spain. It was founded in 1986 and is managed and hosted by the Real Federación Española de Hockey.

Champion by season

Titles by team

See also
Copa del Rey de Hockey Hierba
División de Honor Femenina de Hockey Hierba

External links
 Real Federación Española de Hockey

Women's field hockey competitions in Spain
1985 establishments in Spain
Spain